Seren Serengil (born 6 April 1971) is a Turkish TV presenter, singer and actress. She was born in Istanbul, Turkey, and has acted in films and TV series. Her father Öztürk Serengil was an actor, theatre performer and showman.

Personal life 
Serengil was born on 6 April 1971 at the Istanbul American Hospital. She made her acting debut as a child actress in the 1977 movie Sarhoş, alongside her father Öztürk Serengil. In the same year, she started to perform at Gar Casino together with her father.

After two failed attempts, on 3 April 2009 Serengil gave birth to a daughter from her marriage to Musa Aytun. Their daughter, whom they named Stephanie, was born prematurely and died four days later on 7 April.

In 2017, Gülben Ergen sued Seren Serengil due to the comments she had made about Ergen's private life on Star TV's program Duymayan Kalmasın, and in October 2017 a court in Istanbul ruled that Serengil "could not come closer than 30 meters to Ergen, could not insult her or commit any violence against her" for six months. The court eventually sentenced Serengil to a three-day imprisonment in January 2018.

Serengil, who married Yaşar İpek in May 2018, announced her pregnancy through IVF in August 2019. Later that month, she filed for divorce from her husband and revealed that he had not been by her side during her pregnancy. On 1 September 2019, Serengil announced her pregnancy had ended in miscarriage. The couple's divorce was finalized in September 2020.

Discography 
Albums and EPs
 Ayrıldık (1991)
 Alıştım Sana Birtanem (1994)
 Bana Yasak (1996)
 Bu Gecenin Hatırına (1998)
 Dost Bile Kalamadık (2006)
 Ben Adamı Ayrılırken Tanırım (2010)

Singles
 "Beni Benimle Bırak" (with Yaşar İpek) (2018)
 "Çok Geç" (2019)
 "Kim O Sakallı Adam" (with Yasin Aydın) (2019)
 "Valla" (2022)

Filmography 
Films
 Sarhoş (1977)
 Alev Gibi Bir Kız (1990)
 Başka Olur Ağaların Düğünü (1990)
 Yasak Sokaklar (1993)
 Belalım Benim (1999)
 Şükran Büfe (2000)
 Şaşkın Assolist (2005)

Television programs
 Seren Serengil Show (TGRT)
 Bu Gecenin Hatrına Show (TGRT)
 Yeniden Başlayalım (Barışalım) (StarMax)
 Uçankuş 4x4 (Show TV)
 Seren Serengil ile Evlenir Misin ? (2011) (Show TV)
 Yalnızlar Kulübü (2011) (Beyaz TV)
 Kim Ne Derse Desin (2014) (Cine5)
 Duymayan Kalmasın (2016–2018) (Star TV)
 Duymadık Demeyin (2019) (TV100)
 Söylemezsem Olmaz (2020–) (Beyaz TV)

References

External links
 

Turkish film actresses
Turkish folk-pop singers
1971 births
Living people
People from Artvin
20th-century Turkish actresses
Inmates of Bakırköy Prison for Women
21st-century Turkish singers
21st-century Turkish women singers